Ambulyx dohertyi is a species of moth of the family Sphingidae first described by Walter Rothschild in 1894.

Distribution 
It is known from the Solomon Islands, Papua New Guinea and Queensland, Australia.

Description 
It is similar to Ambulyx moorei and Ambulyx semifervens but the greenish olive stripe across tegula is sharply defined and broader, continued onto the metanotum as a broad stripe. The adult are dimorphic. Males have brown patterned forewings, each with three black spots outlined in white. The hindwings are patterned in yellow and orange. The females have dark purplish brown forewings and darker hindwings, with patterns similar to those of the male.

Subspecies
Ambulyx dohertyi dohertyi
Ambulyx dohertyi novobritannica Brechlin & Kitching, 2010 (Papua New Guinea)
Ambulyx dohertyi novoirlandensis Brechlin & Kitching, 2010 (Papua New Guinea)
Ambulyx dohertyi queenslandi Clark, 1928 (Papua New Guinea, Queensland)
Ambulyx dohertyi salomonis (Rothschild & Jordan, 1903) (Solomon Islands)

References

Ambulyx
Moths described in 1894
Moths of Asia
Moths of Oceania